Iwai (written:  lit. "rock well" or ) is a Japanese surname. Notable people with the surname include:

, Japanese footballer
Iwai Hanshirō I (1652–1699), Japanese kabuki artist
Iwai Hanshirō V (1776–1847), Japanese kabuki artist
Iwai Hanshirō VIII (1829–1882), Japanese kabuki artist
, Japanese economist
, Japanese curler
, Japanese film director
, Japanese footballer
, Japanese artist
, Japanese voice actress
, Japanese pop singer

Japanese-language surnames